Chandra Barot is an Indian film director, working primarily in the Hindi film industry based in Mumbai, Maharashtra. He is best known for having directed the 1978 film Don which has attained cult status in India. The film has been inspiration to various remakes and sequences.

Barot has also been Assistant Director to actor-director Manoj Kumar in Purab Aur Pachhim. After Don, he directed the 1989 Bengali film Aashrita, which grossed .

His upcoming films include Hong Kong Wali Script and Neil Ko Pakadna....Impossible.

Filmography

References

External links

Year of birth missing (living people)
20th-century Indian film directors
Bengali film directors
Film directors from Mumbai
Hindi-language film directors
Living people